Patrick C. Shine (December 25, 1863 – December 8, 1934) was an American politician in the state of Washington. He served in the Washington House of Representatives.

1912 biography by Nelson Wayne Durham

References

Democratic Party members of the Washington House of Representatives
1863 births
1934 deaths